Rafael Suarez, Jr. (born March 5, 1957), known as Ray Suarez, is an American broadcast journalist and author. He is currently a visiting professor at NYU Shanghai and was previously the John J. McCloy Visiting Professor of American Studies at Amherst College. Currently Suarez hosts a radio program and several podcast series: World Affairs for KQED-FM, Going for Broke for the Economic Hardship Reporting Project, and "The Things I Thought About When My Body Was Trying to Kill Me" on cancer and recovery. His next book, on modern American immigration, will be published by Little, Brown. He was the host of Inside Story on Al Jazeera America Story, a daily news program on Al Jazeera America, until that network ceased operation in 2016. Suarez joined the PBS NewsHour in 1999 and was a senior correspondent for the evening news program on the PBS television network until 2013. He is also host of the international news and analysis public radio program America Abroad from Public Radio International. He was the host of the National Public Radio program Talk of the Nation from 1993-1999. In his more than 40-year career in the news business, he has also worked as a radio reporter in London and Rome, as a Los Angeles correspondent for CNN, and as a reporter for the NBC-owned station WMAQ-TV in Chicago. He is currently one of the US correspondents for Euronews.

Personal life
Born and raised in Brooklyn by Puerto Rican parents, Suarez attended public schools in the borough from kindergarten through 12th grade, graduating in 1974 from John Dewey High School. In 1975, he earned the rank of Eagle Scout in the Brooklyn Council. In 2009, Suarez was awarded the Distinguished Eagle Scout Award by the NCAC. He earned a BA in African History from New York University and an MA in the Social Sciences from the University of Chicago. He lives in Washington, D.C., with his wife and three children, Rafael, Eva, and Isabel. Suarez is active locally and nationally in the Episcopal Church.

Career and publications

Suarez began working at the campus radio station of New York University upon enrolling there as a student in 1974 and eventually became the station's news director. He subsequently moved to the university's newspaper.  He later worked as a freelance reporter in London and Rome, and in 1981 his coverage of the attempted assassination of Pope John Paul II led to his being hired by CBS Radio. He was, in turn, hired by ABC and then CNN.

He became a regular correspondent for the PBS NewsHour on October 4, 1999. Between 2009 and 2013, he was one of the program's rotating group of anchors.

He is the author of three books. The most recent is Latino Americans: The 500 Year Legacy That Shaped a Nation published by Penguin/Celebra in 2013. He is also the author of the 1999 book The Old Neighborhood: What We Lost in the Great Suburban Migration: 1966-1999, a social commentary on the causes of the destitution found in the inner city. In 2006, he authored The Holy Vote: The Politics of Faith in America, which examines the way Americans worship, how organized religion and politics intersect in America, and how this powerful collision is transforming the current and future American mind-set. The book is beginning to gather accolades for its timeliness and fair coverage from many sides of the issue. Suarez was a contributing editor for Si Magazine, a short-lived magazine depicting the Latino experience in the U.S.

Suarez hosted the program Destination Casa Blanca, produced by HITN TV from 2008-2011. The program covered Latino politics and policy for a national audience from Washington, D.C.

He is a contributor to the Oxford Companion to American Politics (June 2012), and wrote the companion volume to a PBS documentary series on the history of Latinos in America, Latino Americans: The 500-Year History That Shaped a Nation published by Penguin in 2013.

Suarez has contributed to many other books, including ''How I Learned English, Brooklyn: A State of Mind, Saving America's Treasures, and About Men. His columns, op-eds, and criticism have been published in The New York Times, the Washington Post, and the Chicago Tribune.

He co-wrote and hosted the 2009 documentary for PBS Jerusalem: Center of the World, and narrated for PBS Anatomy of a Pandemic, on the H1N1 outbreak.

In October 2021, the first two episodes of Suarez's podcast series Going for Broke were released by The Nation magazine in partnership with the Economic Hardship Reporting Project.

Honors

Named as a 1996 Utne Reader "Visionaries"
Named as Hispanic Business "100 Influentials" among American Latinos
1995 Global Awareness Award by Current History Magazine
1996 Studs Terkel Award, Community Media Workshop
1993-94 duPont-Columbia Silver Baton Awards (part of NPR's award for on-site coverage of the first all-race elections in South Africa)
1994-95 duPont-Columbia Silver Baton Awards (part of NPR's award for coverage of the first 100 days of the 104th Congress)
1996 Rubén Salazar Award from the National Council of La Raza
2005 Distinguished Policy Leadership Award from UCLA's School of Public Policy
Distinguished Alumnus Award from NYU
Professional Achievement Award from the University of Chicago
2009 - Distinguished Eagle Scout
2010-Hall of Fame, National Association of Hispanic Journalists
2012- Bridge-Builder Award, Tanenbaum Center for Interreligious Understanding
2013 Schwartz Visiting Fellow, Pomfret School, Pomfret CT.
Honorary doctorates
Kalamazoo College, Doctor of Humane Letters

Bibliographies

See also
National Association of Hispanic Journalists

References

External links

Inside Story and Ray Suarez bio
Ray Suarez Interview on KCTS 9 Public Television

1957 births
Al Jazeera people
American Episcopalians
American radio reporters and correspondents
American radio journalists
American social sciences writers
American television journalists
CNN people
Hispanic and Latino American people
American male journalists
John Dewey High School alumni
New York University alumni
University of Chicago alumni
Living people
PBS people